Slavko Mandić (born 4 January 1972) is a former Serbian-born Croatian football defender.

Club career
Born in Tavankut, SR Serbia, back in Yugoslavia, Slavko Mandić started playing with FK Bačka 1901 youth team in 1984, and by the 1990–91 season he was already in the first-team.  After Bačka, he joined the major club in the city, FK Spartak Subotica, having played with them in the 1997–98 First League of FR Yugoslavia. He then played with FK Bor in the 1998–99 Second League of FR Yugoslavia.  He played the 2000–01 season in the Croatian First League, first half-season with NK Osijek, second with NK Zadar. The next season, he played the first half with ŁKS Łódź in Polish second level, I Liga, and the second with FK Rudar Ugljevik in the First League of the Republika Srpska. He then played with finish side RoPS in the 2005 Veikkausliiga and in 2006 with Icelandic lower-league side KS Siglufjörður.

References

External links
 

1972 births
Living people
People from North Bačka District
Croats of Vojvodina
Association football defenders
Croatian footballers
FK Bačka 1901 players
FK Spartak Subotica players
FK Bor players
NK Osijek players
NK Zadar players
ŁKS Łódź players
FK Rudar Ugljevik players
Rovaniemen Palloseura players
Knattspyrnufélag Fjallabyggðar players
First League of Serbia and Montenegro players
Croatian Football League players
I liga players
Veikkausliiga players
1. deild karla players
Expatriate footballers in Poland
Croatian expatriate sportspeople in Poland
Expatriate footballers in Finland
Croatian expatriate sportspeople in Finland
Expatriate footballers in Iceland
Croatian expatriate sportspeople in Iceland